RED | For Africa  (written RED) is an African media company based in Nigeria and Ghana. RED | For Africa is a content, consulting and data company. Its headquarters is in Lagos, Nigeria.

RED | For Africa owns the brands YNaija, Red Media Africa, The Future Awards Africa and StateCraft.

Its founders are Chude Jideonwo and Adebola Williams. They were awarded Young Business Leader of the Year in the All Africa Business Leaders Awards in 2014.

Divisions
RED | For Africa has three divisions: Content, Consulting and Data.

Red Media Africa 
Red Media Africa (RMA) is a public relations and customer experience company.

StateCraft Inc.
Its governance communication company, StateCraft, was the official communications agency for Nigeria’s president, Muhammadu Buhari during the Nigerian general election, 2015. Deploying over 3,000 volunteers and reaching over 77 million people, the digitally driven campaign communication built a media-driven national movement that is now being replicated across West Africa.

Generation Y! 
Red's content arm includes the TV shows Rubbin’ Minds (Nigerian talk show for young people airing on Channels TV), eXploring! (ONTV Nigeria); the online magazines: YNaija (a newspaper for young Nigerians), The SeptemberStandard.com and TechAfri.ca.

Its events include The Black Ball, and The Red Summit.

The Future Project 
The development arm has The Future Project (a social enterprise with a commitment to human and capital development especially in Africa) which houses The Future Awards Africa (TFAA) and The Future Enterprise Support Scheme (TFESS).

TFAA is an annual award that recognises young people between the ages of 18 and 31, who have made an outstanding achievement. Forbes described the Awards as the "Most important awards for outstanding young Africans."

TFESS is a series of seminars, workshops and conferences that help young professionals, graduates and undergraduates increase their knowledge and capacity. Code2Earn, Aiki Nigeria (an employability portal created with Microsoft), Intern4Jobs, and Startups4Africa are some of these.

Church Culture 
Church Culture is a media company under RED | For Africa. Church Culture aims to attract more people to the church. The sub-company specializes in Advertising, Media Planning and Buying, Crisis Communication, Social Media Management and Monitoring amongst others. Launched in 2017 via an Easter Show that aired on Channels TV, the platform continues to communicate through the Church Blog. Church Culture is aimed at spotlighting the church in Nigeria and its impact in Africa, and discussing how the Church can consolidate influence in society.

References

Mass media companies of Nigeria
Companies based in Lagos